Pogochaetia is a genus of moths in the family Gelechiidae.

Species
 Pogochaetia solitaria Staudinger, 1880
 Pogochaetia dmitrii Bidzilya, 2005

References

Gnorimoschemini